Klaudia Kardasz (born 2 May 1996) is a Polish athlete specialising in the shot put. She represented her country at the 2017 World Championships without qualifying for the final. In addition, she won a silver medal at the 2017 European U23 Championships.

Kardasz was born in Białystok. Her personal bests in the event are 18.48 metres outdoors (Berlin 2018) and 18.63 metres indoors (Glasgow 2019).

International competitions

References

1996 births
Living people
Polish female shot putters
World Athletics Championships athletes for Poland
Sportspeople from Białystok
Universiade medalists in athletics (track and field)
Podlasie Białystok athletes
Universiade silver medalists for Poland
Medalists at the 2017 Summer Universiade
Medalists at the 2019 Summer Universiade
Athletes (track and field) at the 2020 Summer Olympics
Olympic athletes of Poland